The 29th Golden Horse Awards (Mandarin:第29屆金馬獎) took place on December 12, 1992 at Sun Yat-sen Memorial Hall in Taipei, Taiwan.

References

29th
1992 film awards
1992 in Taiwan